Fort Utah is a 1967 American Western film and the 150th feature film directed by Lesley Selander.  Produced by A. C. Lyles for Paramount, it starred John Ireland and Virginia Mayo.

Plot
A former gunslinger, Tom Horn (John Ireland). has to fight off a renegade cavalryman and his band of outlaws who are terrorising pioneer settlers and the local Indians.

Cast
 John Ireland - Tom Horn
 Virginia Mayo - Linda Lee
 Scott Brady - Dajin
 John Russell - Eli Jonas
 Robert Strauss - Ben Stokes
 Richard Arlen - Sam Tyler
 James Craig - Bo Greer
 Jim Davis - Scarecrow
 Don 'Red' Barry - Harris
 Read Morgan - Cavalry Lieutenant
 Regis Parton - Rafe
 Eric Cody - Shirt

See also
List of American films of 1967

External links
 

1967 films
Paramount Pictures films
1967 Western (genre) films
American Western (genre) films
Films directed by Lesley Selander
Films scored by Jimmie Haskell
1960s English-language films
1960s American films